Medullary carcinoma may refer to one of several different tumors of epithelial origin.  As the term "medulla" is a generic anatomic descriptor for the mid-layer of various organ tissues, a medullary tumor usually arises from the "mid-layer tissues" of the relevant organ.

Medullary carcinoma most commonly refers to:
 Medullary thyroid cancer
 Medullary carcinoma of the breast

Medullary carcinoma may also refer to tumors of the:
 Ampulla of Vater
 Gallbladder
 Kidney (Renal medullary carcinoma)
 Large intestine
 Pancreas
 Stomach

References

External links 

Carcinoma